Lake Harrington is a lake in McLeod County, in the U.S. state of Minnesota.

Lake Harrington was named for Lewis Harrington, an early settler.

References

Lakes of Minnesota
Lakes of McLeod County, Minnesota